Vicente Januario Melgar Corpeño (born September 6, 1982) is a Salvadoran former footballer who played as a midfielder.

Club career
Melgar was born in El Salvador. He played for several top level sides in El Salvador, most notably for FAS in 2008–09.

In December 2010, he was linked with a return to FAS but it didn't materialise.

International career
Melgar made his debut for El Salvador in a March 2007 friendly match against Honduras and was selected for the El Salvador national team squad for the 2007 CONCACAF Gold Cup finals, but he did not play and has not earned any more caps.

References

External links

1982 births
Living people
People from San Salvador Department
Association football midfielders
Salvadoran footballers
El Salvador international footballers
2007 CONCACAF Gold Cup players
A.D. Isidro Metapán footballers
C.D. Chalatenango footballers
C.D. FAS footballers